Bis(2-chloroethyl)selenide is the organoselenium compound with the formula . As a haloalkyl derivative of selenium, it is an analogue of bis(2-chloroethyl)sulfide, the prototypical sulfur mustard used in chemical warfare. Bis(2-chloroethyl)selenide has not been used as a chemical warfare agent, however it is still a potent alkylating agent and has potential in chemotherapy.

See also
 Diethyl selenide
 O-Mustard

References

Alkylating agents
Chloroethyl compounds
Mustard compounds
Organoselenium compounds